Fantômas is the debut studio album by American experimental metal supergroup Fantômas. It was released on April 27, 1999, and was the first album released on Ipecac Recordings.

Content 

The cover depicts the Spanish poster for the 1965 French movie Fantômas se déchaîne, translated in Spanish as "Fantômas amenaza al mundo" ("Fantômas threatens the world"). Because of this, some people refer to this album as Amenaza al Mundo; however, it is officially self-titled.

The album is designed to serve as a soundtrack to a comic book.

Reception 

Greg Prato of AllMusic said, "if you're looking for something completely original and cutting edge, Fantômas is highly recommended".

Track listing 

All songs written by Mike Patton

Note: Track 13 is not listed, as thirteen is considered an unlucky number. There is no song on this track, simply the fading out of a cymbal from "Book 1: Page 12", the previous track. The next Fantômas album, The Director's Cut, also has silence in place of track 13.

Personnel 

 Mike Patton – vocals, samples, production, album cover artwork
 Dave Lombardo – drums
 Buzz Osborne – guitar
 Trevor Dunn – bass
 Billy Anderson – engineering
 Brian Simakis credited as Gummo – engineering
 Different Fur – mixing
 Adam Muñoz – mixing
 George Horn – mastering
 Zuccatosa – album artwork
 John Yates – album artwork
 Greg Werckman – management

References

External links 

 

1999 debut albums
Concept albums
Fantômas (band) albums
Ipecac Recordings albums
Experimental music albums